Le Bourgeois gentilhomme (translated as The Bourgeois Gentleman, The Middle-Class Aristocrat, or The Would-Be Noble) is a five-act comédie-ballet – a play intermingled with music, dance and singing – written by Molière, first presented on 14 October 1670 before the court of Louis XIV at the Château of Chambord by Molière's troupe of actors. Subsequent public performances were given at the theatre of the Palais-Royal beginning on 23 November 1670. The music was composed by Jean-Baptiste Lully, the choreography was by Pierre Beauchamp, the sets were by Carlo Vigarani and the costumes were done by the chevalier d’Arvieux.

Le Bourgeois gentilhomme satirizes attempts at social climbing and the bourgeois personality, poking fun both at the vulgar, pretentious middle-class and the vain, snobbish aristocracy. The title is meant as an oxymoron: in Molière's France, a "gentleman" was by definition nobly born, and thus there could be no such thing as a bourgeois gentleman. The play is in prose (except for the ballet openings which are in verse).

Synopsis 
The play takes place at Mr. Jourdain's house in Paris. Jourdain is a middle-aged "bourgeois" whose father grew rich as a cloth merchant. The foolish Jourdain now has one aim in life, which is to rise above this middle-class background and be accepted as an aristocrat. To this end, he orders splendid new clothes and is very happy when the tailor's boy mockingly addresses him as "my Lord". He applies himself to learning the gentlemanly arts of fencing, dancing, music and philosophy, despite his age; in doing so he continually manages to make a fool of himself, to the disgust of his hired teachers. His philosophy lesson becomes a basic lesson on language in which he is surprised and delighted to learn that he has been speaking prose all his life without knowing it.

{|
|Par ma foi ! il y a plus de quarante ans que je dis de la prose sans que j'en susse rien, et je vous suis le plus obligé du monde de m'avoir appris cela.
|My faith! For more than forty years I have been speaking prose while knowing nothing of it, and I am the most obliged person in the world to you for telling me so.
|}

Madame Jourdain, his intelligent wife, sees that he is making a fool of himself and urges him to return to his previous middle-class life, and to forget all he has learned. A cash-strapped nobleman called Dorante has attached himself to M. Jourdain. He secretly despises Jourdain but flatters his aristocratic dreams. For example, by telling Jourdain that he mentioned his name to the King at Versailles, he can get Jourdain to pay his debts. Jourdain's dreams of being upper-class go higher and higher. He dreams of marrying a Marchioness, Dorimène, and having his daughter Lucile marry a nobleman. But Lucile is in love with the middle-class Cléonte. Of course, M. Jourdain refuses his permission for Lucile to marry Cléonte.

Then Cléonte, with the assistance of his valet Covielle and Mme Jourdain, disguises himself and presents himself to Jourdain as the son of the Sultan of Turkey. Jourdain is taken in and is very pleased to have his daughter marry foreign royalty. He is even more delighted when the "Turkish prince" informs him that, as father of the bride, he too will be officially ennobled at a special ceremony. The play ends with this ridiculous ceremony, including Sabir standing in for Turkish.

Performances 
The original production brought together the finest actors and musicians of the time. Molière played the role of Monsieur Jourdain, clothed in bright colors trimmed with silver lace and multicolored feathers; André Hubert played Madame Jourdain (travesti); Mlle de Brie played Dorimène; Armande Béjart played Lucile; and the composer Jean-Baptiste Lully danced the mufti in the last act cérémonie des Turcs.

Le Bourgeois gentilhomme reflected the then-current trend for les turqueries, all things related to the Ottoman Empire. The work stemmed from the scandal caused by the Turkish ambassador Suleiman Aga who, upon visiting the court of Louis XIV in 1669, affirmed the superiority of the Ottoman court over that of the Sun King.

The first performance of Der Bürger als Edelmann, a German version of the play, took place on 25 October 1912, adapted by Hugo von Hofmannsthal with incidental music by Richard Strauss. The turquerie was replaced by an appended operatic entertainment Ariadne auf Naxos, composed by Strauss to a libretto by Hofmannsthal, in which Jourdain's eccentric requirements have led to Ariadne being marooned on a desert island where there just happens to be a commedia dell'arte troupe. The production was directed by Max Reinhardt. The combination of play and opera proved problematic. Hofmannsthal created a revised version of the play, reinstating the turquerie and removing the opera. Strauss provided further incidental music including some arrangements of Lully. Meanwhile, the entertainment was provided with a separate operatic prologue and this is the form in which Ariadne is now usually given.

George Balanchine choreographed a number of modern versions, from the 1930s to the 1970s, using Strauss's score. The first version was performed in 1932 by Wassily de Basil and René Blum's Ballet Russe de Monte-Carlo, featuring David Lichine and Tamara Toumanova, with sets by Alexandre Benois. In 1944, a new version of the ballet was performed by the second iteration of the Ballet Russe de Monte-Carlo, with Nicholas Magallanes (taking over for an injured Frederic Franklin), Maria Tallchief, and Nathalie Krassovska. The most well-known version, from 1979 for the New York City Opera, featured input from Jerome Robbins, who stepped in during a period of Balanchine's illness. Peter Martins also choreographed one scene near the end of the ballet. The production starred Jean-Pierre Bonnefoux, Patricia McBride, Rudolf Nureyev, Darla Hoover, Michael Puleo and students of the School of American Ballet.

Informed by the musical and theatrical traditions of 17th century France, the production revived the musical and dance interludes originally scored by Jean-Baptiste Lully and the work was presented in its entirety. The wardrobe was notably bourgeois and ridiculous, evidently the intent of the directors to present Monsieur Jordain as a naive, stunned and yet vulnerable man new to the world of money and privilege "victim and architect of the action". The use of candlelight as the only lighting source on stage and a frontal performance style even during conversations between characters gave the production a distinctly baroque air and was well received. The 2005 production was the first ever since the play's first performance to render it in its entirety, as faithful as possible to the original score and script by Molière and Lully.

Roles 
 Monsieur Jourdaina bourgeois
 Madame Jourdainhis wife
 Lucilethe daughter of Monsieur Jourdain
 Nicoletheir maid
 Cléontesuitor of Lucile
 CovielleCléonte's lackey and who takes an interest in Nicole
 DoranteCount, suitor of Dorimène
 DorimèneMarchioness, a widow
 Master of Philosophy
 Music Master
 Pupil of the Music Master
 Dancing Master
 Fencing Master
 Tailor
 Tailor's apprentice
 Two lackeys

Many male and female musicians, instrumentalists, dancers, cooks, tailor's apprentices, and others are needed for the interludes.

Audio adaptations 
An hour-long version adapted by Harry McFadden was broadcast on the NBC radio series Great Plays on December 18, 1938.

References

Notes

Sources consulted 
 Garreau, Joseph E. (1984). "Molière", pp. 397–418 in McGraw-Hill Encyclopedia of World Drama, Stanley Hochman, editor in chief. New York: McGraw-Hill. .

External links 

 Le Bourgeois gentilhomme English translation on the Gutenberg Project
 The Bourgeois Nobleman English translation by Sue Rippon
 
 Le Bourgeois gentilhomme Original texts  from 
 

1670 plays
Compositions by Jean-Baptiste Lully
Satirical plays
Plays adapted into ballets
French plays adapted into films
Plays adapted into television shows
Plays by Molière
Incidental music
Bourgeoisie